Khalid Bilal Wooten (born February 19, 1990) is a Canadian football cornerback who is a free agent. He played college football at Nevada and was drafted by the Tennessee Titans in the sixth round of the 2013 NFL Draft.

Early years
He attended Carter High School in Rialto, California. He was a four-year letterman in high school. He selected as the Citrus Belt League MVP in 2007 and also was selected two-time first-team All-League team for the 2006 and 2007 seasons.

College career
He played college football at Nevada. He was selected to Preseason All-MW Second-team by the Phil Steele in his senior season. In, 2012, He also was selected to the Preseason All-MW Third-team by College Football Madness.

Professional career

Tennessee Titans
On April 27, 2013, he was selected in the 6th round (202 overall) by the Tennessee Titans in the 2013 NFL Draft. The Titans released Wooten on August 31, 2013. He was signed to the practice squad for the Titans the following day. Tennessee waived him again on August 31, 2014.

Montreal Alouettes
Wooten played in two games, starting in both instances, for the Montreal Alouettes (CFL) in 2016.

Hamilton Tiger-Cats 
On May 1, 2017, Wooten was traded to the Hamilton Tiger-Cats in exchange for running back Cierre Wood, defensive end Denzell Perine.

Atlantic City Blackjacks
On April 3, 2019, Wooten was assigned to the Atlantic City Blackjacks.

Massachusetts Pirates
Later in 2019, Wooten signed to the Massachusetts Pirates, where he has played for three seasons including on the 2021 United Bowl championship team. On June 13, 2022, Wooten was released by the Pirates.

References

External links
Nevada Profile

1990 births
Living people
Tennessee Titans players
Montreal Alouettes players
Sportspeople from Rialto, California
Players of American football from California
American football cornerbacks
Canadian football defensive backs
American players of Canadian football
Nevada Wolf Pack football players
Hamilton Tiger-Cats players
Toronto Argonauts players
Massachusetts Pirates players
Atlantic City Blackjacks players